Pedhambe is a village in Chiplun taluka of Ratnagiri district in the state of Maharashtra, India.

References

Villages in Ratnagiri district